Cinderella II: Dreams Come True (also known as simply Cinderella: Dreams Come True) is a 2002 American direct-to-video fantasy comedy anthology film. It is directed by John Kafka and features a screenplay written by Jill E. Blotevogel, Tom Rogers, and Julie Selbo. It is the first direct-to-video sequel to the 1950 Disney film Cinderella, and the first in the series to use digital ink and paint. It stars the voices of Jennifer Hale, Russi Taylor, Corey Burton, and Rob Paulsen. It was released on February 26, 2002.

Plot

Prologue
In the royal palace, Cinderella's mice friends Gus and Jaq head to a chamber where the Fairy Godmother is reading the story of Cinderella to the other mice. Much to their disappointment, Gus and Jaq arrive just as she has finished the story. With her help, the mice set off to make a new book to narrate what happens after the Happily Ever After, by stringing three segments of stories together into one narrative.

Aim to Please
In the first segment, Cinderella and Prince Charming return from their Honeymoon, and Cinderella reunites with her mice friends and her dog Bruno. She is later put in charge of the palace banquets and parties while the King and Prince Charming are away. However, Cinderella is dissatisfied with the emphasis on tradition, and decides to organize the upcoming party her own way. Although he initially seems to be shocked at Cinderella's changes, the King ends up satisfied with the party.

Tall Tail
In the second segment, Jaq thinks he is too small to help Cinderella in the palace as he did in the first movie. The Fairy Godmother turns him into a human, named "Sir Hugh," so he can help out. However, this does not stop Pom Pom, the palace's cat, from chasing Jaq around. After an incident with an elephant at a fair, he learns to be happy with himself.

An Uncommon Romance
In the last segment, Anastasia, one of Cinderella's stepsisters, falls in love with a baker named Lathyn, of whom her mother Lady Tremaine and older sister Drizella disapprove. Cinderella, unbeknownst to anyone else, arrives and secretly watches as Lady Tremaine berates Anastasia, thus leading her to help Anastasia in getting ready for the ball together. Later at the ball, Anastasia thanks Cinderella for helping her. Lucifer also has an encounter with Pom Pom, the castle's cat, with whom he falls in love.

Epilogue
The mice finish their book, and the movie ends as they gather in front of the fire with Cinderella, who begins to read their story.

Cast
 Jennifer Hale as Cinderella. She was voiced by Ilene Woods in the original film.
 Rob Paulsen as Jaq/Grand Duke/The Baker/Sir Hugh/Bert/Flower Vendor. Both the King and Grand Duke were voiced by Luis van Rooten in the original film.
 Corey Burton as Gus. Jaq and Gus were voiced by Jimmy MacDonald in the original film.
 Andre Stojka as The King. 
 Russi Taylor as Fairy Godmother, Drizella Tremaine, Mary Mouse, Beatrice, Countless Le Grande and Daphne. Fairy Godmother was voiced by Verna Felton in the original film. Drizella was voiced by Rhoda Williams in the first film
 Susanne Blakeslee as Lady Tremaine. She was voiced by Eleanor Audley in the original film.
 Tress MacNeille as Anastasia Tremaine. She was originally voiced by Lucille Bliss.
 Holland Taylor as Prudence
 Christopher Daniel Barnes as Prince Charming. He was voiced by William Edward Phipps in the original film.
 Frank Welker as Lucifer/Pom-Pom/Bruno. He was voiced by June Foray in the original film. Bruno was also voiced MacDonald in the first film.

Soundtrack
The songs for the film were performed by Brooke Allison, and while a true soundtrack was never released, all the songs were included on the compilation album Disney's Princess Favorites, which was released shortly before the film. One song, Put It Together (Bibbidi Bobbidi Boo), was also included on the compilation album Superstar Hits, which was released shortly after the film.

Reception
While the movie did surpass the $120 million mark, critical reception was mainly negative. Many critics agreed that it looked like pieced-together remains of a rejected television series, akin to Beauty and the Beast: Belle's Magical World and Atlantis: Milo's Return. On Rotten Tomatoes, it currently holds an 11% approval rating based on 9 reviews.

Release
Cinderella II: Dreams Come True was released on February 26, 2002, on DVD and VHS. It was then re-released on December 19, 2006, as a special-edition DVD, going back in the Disney Vault on January 31, 2008. On November 20, 2012, the film was released with the other Cinderella sequel Cinderella III: A Twist in Time as a two-movie collection on DVD and for the first time on Blu-ray. Both sequels along with the 'Diamond Edition' release of the original film returned to the Disney Vault on January 31, 2017.

References

External links

 
 
 
 
 
 Cinderella II: Dreams Come True - The Official Disney DVD Website

2002 films
2002 animated films
2002 direct-to-video films
2000s American animated films
2002 fantasy films
2000s musical films
Films scored by Michael Tavera
American animated fantasy films
American anthology films
American children's animated films
American children's fantasy films
American sequel films
Animated musical films
Direct-to-video sequel films
Cinderella (franchise)
Disney direct-to-video animated films
DisneyToon Studios animated films
Films about fairies and sprites
Disney Television Animation films
Films about wish fulfillment
2000s children's animated films
Films set in palaces
Films set in France
Animated anthology films
2000s English-language films